Stern Hall is the name of several buildings, including:

A University of California, Berkeley dormitory Stern Hall (Berkeley)
An alternate name for Carnegie Hall's Isaac Stern Auditorium
A Dillard University science building, housing two academic divisions and several laboratories
A Hobart and William Smith College social science building, housing four academic departments
An Intrepid Sea-Air-Space Museum building, housing exhibits on pioneering naval events
A Mills College building
A Stanford University building complex, housing six dormitories
A Tulane University science building, housing five academic departments
A Waterford-KaMhlaba United World College of Southern Africa auditorium

Other
Stern Hall, Inc., a Chicago-based event/consumer/trade marketing agency.

Architectural disambiguation pages